John Oliver Shanley (born 1943), known as Ollie Shanley is an Irish former Gaelic footballer who played for a number of clubs, including Trim and Simonstown Gaels, and at inter-county level with the Meath senior football team. He usually lined out as a left corner-forward.

Honours

Player

Duleek
Meath Intermediate Football Championship: 1966

Meath
All-Ireland Senior Football Championship: 1967
Leinster Senior Football Championship: 1964, 1966, 1967, 1970

Coach

Meath
Leinster Minor Football Championship: 1977

References

1943 births
Living people
Trim Gaelic footballers
Meath inter-county Gaelic footballers
Winners of one All-Ireland medal (Gaelic football)
Gaelic football managers